Väinö Jeremias Sipilä (24 December 1897 – 12 September 1987) was a Finnish long-distance runner. Sipilä competed in the 1924 and 1928 Summer Olympics, placing fourth in the 10,000 metres and being part of Finland's winning cross-country team in the 1924 Games. He held world records at the unusual distances of 20,000 metres and 30,000 metres for several years.

Career
Sipilä was Finnish cross country champion in 1923, 1924, 1925 and 1929. At the 1924 Summer Olympics in Paris Sipilä first placed fourth in the 10,000 m race (behind Ville Ritola, Edvin Wide and Eero Berg) and then took part in the 10.65 km cross-country race, which doubled as an individual and team competition. In the extremely hot and demanding conditions, more than half of the participants failed to finish, including Sipilä and two other members of the Finnish team, Berg and Eino Rastas; Finland only barely got a valid team result, even though its stars Paavo Nurmi and Ritola placed a clear first and second. Sipilä was in fourth place in the 6.2 km intermediate standings, ahead of eventual individual bronze medalist Earl Johnson of the United States, but had to drop out shortly after that point.

In 1925 Sipilä broke the world record at the unusual distance of 20,000 metres, running 1:06:29.0 in Stockholm and breaking Ville Kyrönen's record of 1:07:07.2 from the previous year. At the 1928 Summer Olympics Sipilä represented Finland in the marathon, but only placed 15th; a month after the Olympics he broke the world record for 30,000 metres at Tampere, running 1:43:07.8. In the same race, Martti Marttelin broke the 25,000 m world record as a split.

Sipilä's 20,000 m record was broken in 1930 by Paavo Nurmi, who ran 1:04:38.4; Nurmi's 1928 hour record of 19,210 m would have been equal to a time close to 1:02:30. Sipilä's 30,000 m record was broken in 1931 by Argentina's Juan Carlos Zabala, who went on to win the 1932 Olympic marathon.

Personal life and legacy
His daughter Leena became an Olympic sprint runner.

A road at Syrjänharju, Pälkäne, where Sipilä trained, has been named after him.

Notes

References

1897 births
1987 deaths
People from Pälkäne
Finnish male long-distance runners
Athletes (track and field) at the 1924 Summer Olympics
Athletes (track and field) at the 1928 Summer Olympics
Olympic athletes of Finland
World record setters in athletics (track and field)
Medalists at the 1924 Summer Olympics
Olympic gold medalists for Finland
Olympic cross country runners
Sportspeople from Pirkanmaa